Chestnut Hill Historic District may refer to:

Chestnut Hill Historic District (Birmingham, Alabama), a National Register of Historic Places listing in Birmingham, Alabama
Chestnut Hill Reservoir Historic District, Boston and Newton, Massachusetts
Chestnut Hill Historic District (Brookline, Massachusetts)
Chestnut Hill Historic District (Asheville, North Carolina), a National Register of Historic Places listing in Buncombe County, North Carolina
Chestnut Hill Historic District (Philadelphia, Pennsylvania)

See also
Old Chestnut Hill Historic District, Newton, Massachusetts
The Chestnut Hill, Newton, Massachusetts
Chestnut Hill-Plateau Historic District, a historic area in the Highland Park neighborhood of Richmond, Virginia